Dennis Leonard (born 1951) is an American baseball player.

Den(n)is Leonard may also refer to:

Dennis Leonard (sound editor), sound editor
Denis Leonard of Westmeath County Council
Dennis Leonard, engineer on Dead Set (album)
Dennis Leonard, of KWGN-TV

See also